Finastra is a financial software company headquartered in London, England. The company offers a portfolio of products and solutions to the retail banking, transaction banking, lending, and treasury capital markets. Finastra was formed in 2017 by the combination of London-based Misys, a provider of financial operations software, and global payments and lending technology provider D+H. At the time of its formation, Finastra was considered the third-largest financial services company in the world.

Misys history

1970 to 2000 
The company was founded by Roger Morgan and Kevin Lomax as Misys to develop insurance software.

In 1997, it bought Medic Computer Systems, a healthcare software business.

2000 to present 
In June 2001, Misys bought DBS Management, a supplier of software to Independent Financial Advisors.

In June 2001, Misys bought Sunquest Information Systems, a United States based supplier of medical systems software.

In January 2004, Misys bought IQ Financial Systems from Deutsche Bank.

In July 2005, Misys, bought Almonde.

In February 2006, Misys bought Intesio.

In March 2006, Misys bought NEOMAlogic.

Mike Lawrie was appointed CEO in October 2006.

In July 2007, Misys sold its diagnostic information software division to Vista Equity Partners.

In October 2008, Misys' subsidiary, Misys Healthcare, was merged with Allscripts, a medical records business, to become Allscripts-Misys Healthcare Solutions, Inc.

In November 2010, Misys bought Sophis, a provider of portfolio and risk management software.

In February 2012, Misys entered into merger talks with its Swiss rival Temenos. The deal later collapsed when the two sides were unable to agree to terms.

In March 2012, private equity firm Vista Equity Partners announced that it had reached an agreement to acquire Misys.

In June 2012, upon the completion of the acquisition by Vista Equity Partners, Misys was merged with Turaz, another acquisition of Vista. Turaz was formerly the treasury and risk management software division of Thomson Reuters.

In February 2014, Misys bought Hungary-based IND Group, a supplier of online and mobile banking software.

In August 2014, Misys bought Custom Credit Systems, a US-based supplier of credit workflow and loan origination software.

In March 2017, D+H announced that it would be acquired by Vista Equity Partners and combined with Misys

In June 2017, the merger with D+H was completed, and the company was rebranded as Finastra

In January 2018, Finastra acquired Olfa Soft for its FX e-trading platform for financial institutions.

In April 2018, Finastra launched an innovation lab in Hong Kong to enable collaboration between banks and other fintech companies.

In June 2018, Finastra announced it acquired Malauzai (Austin, Texas), a provider of mobile and internet banking solutions for community financial institutions.

In June 2018, Finastra, launched FusionFabric.cloud, an open platform to develop apps, connect ecosystems and foster collaboration between banks and fintechs.

D+H History 
Following a series of acquisitions starting in 2005, D+H shifted its business to providing financial technology services worldwide.

In 2011, D+H went public on the Toronto Stock Exchange. It acquired Mortgagebot and ASSET Inc. in 2011, Avista Solutions in 2012, Harland Financial Solutions and Compushare in 2013, and Fundtech (for $1.25b) in 2015.

In 2016, D+H added blockchain technology capabilities to its global payments platform. The added capabilities enabled banks that use its Global PAYplus services platform to access distributed ledgers to connect networks, move money in real-time and improve access to liquidity.

On 17 June 2017, D+H announced that it would be acquired by Vista Equity Partners and combined with Misys, operating under the new company name Finastra for a total enterprise value of approximately $4.8 billion.

References

External links 
 Official site

Companies formerly listed on the London Stock Exchange
Software companies of the United Kingdom
Companies based in the City of Westminster
Software companies established in 1979
Financial software companies
Banking software companies
Financial technology companies
1979 establishments in England
British brands